The third season of the tattoo competition series Ink Master premiered on Spike on July 16 and concluded on October 8, 2013 with a total of 13 episodes. The show is hosted and judged by Jane's Addiction guitarist Dave Navarro, with accomplished tattoo artists Chris Núñez and Oliver Peck serving as series regular judges. The winner will receive a $100,000 prize, a feature in Inked magazine and the title of Ink Master.

This season saw the return of season two contestant Katherine "Tatu Baby" Flores, who originally finished the competition in 4th place.

The winner of the third season of Ink Master was Joey Hamilton, with Jime Litwalk being the runner-up.

Judging and ranking
This season saw a slight change in the judging process.

Judging panel
The judging panel is the table of three primary judges, and any guest judges for that episode if applicable.

Audience voting
Audience voting returned and expanded to include Twitter.

Human Canvas Jury
Following the elimination tattoo, the human canvases gather and vote for the worst tattoo of the day that'll send one artist to the bottom. While the primary judges have the final say, the weight of the canvas vote does affect the judging panel's final decision.

Contestants
Names, experience, and cities stated are at time of filming.

Contestant progress

  The contestant won Ink Master.
 The contestant was the runner-up.
 The contestant finished third in the competition.
 The contestant advanced to the finale.
 The contestant won Best Tattoo of the Day.
 The contestant was among the top.
 The contestant received positive critiques.
 The contestant received negative critiques.
 The contestant was in the bottom.
 The contestant was in the bottom and voted Worst Tattoo of the Day by the Human Canvas Jury.
 The contestant was eliminated from the competition.
 The contestant was voted Worst Tattoo of the Day and was eliminated from the competition.
 The contestant was eliminated in the Flash Challenge.
 The contestant returned as a guest for that episode.

Episodes
<onlyinclude>

References

External links
 
 
 

2013 American television seasons
Season 3